is one of three wards of Sagamihara, Kanagawa, Japan. It's located in the western part of the city and covers about 77% of city's area. To the east Midori-ku faces Chūō-ku and to the north faces Machida and Hachiōji. 

Midori-ku was created on April 1, 2010 when Sagamihara became a city designated by government ordinance (a "designated city"). 

As of March 2010, Midori-ku had a population of 174,784, with a land area of 253.8 square kilometers.

Education
Municipal junior high schools:

 Aihara (相原中学校)
 Asahi (旭中学校)
 Fujino (藤野中学校)
 Hokuso (北相中学校)
 Kushikawa (串川中学校)
 Nakazawa (中沢中学校)
 Nakano (中野中学校)
 Osawa (大沢中学校)
 Sagamigaoka (相模丘中学校)
 Toya (鳥屋中学校)
 Uchide (内出中学校)
 Uchigo (内郷中学校)

Municipal elementary schools:

 Aihara (相原小学校)
 Asahi (旭小学校)
 Chigira (千木良小学校)
 Fujino (藤野小学校)
 Fujino Kita (藤野北小学校)
 Fujino Minami (藤野南小学校)
 Hashimoto (橋本小学校)
 Hirota (広田小学校)
 Kawashiri (川尻小学校)
 Keihoku (桂北小学校)
 Koryo (広陵小学校)
 Kushikawa (串川小学校)
 Kuzawa (九沢小学校)
 Miyakami (宮上小学校)
 Nakano (中野小学校)
 Negoya (根小屋小学校)
 Nihonmatsu (二本松小学校)
 Osawa (大沢小学校)
 Otori (大島小学校)
 Sakunoguchi (作の口小学校)
 Shonan (湘南小学校)
 Taimada (当麻田小学校)
 Toya (鳥屋小学校)
 Tsukui Chuo (津久井中央小学校)
 Uchigo (内郷小学校)

References

Wards of Sagamihara